Nicolas Bacri (born 23 November 1961) is a French composer. He has written works that include seven symphonies, eleven string quartets, eight cantatas, two one-act operas, three piano sonatas, two cello and piano sonatas, four violin and piano sonatas, six piano trios, four violin concertos and numerous other concertante works.

Career 

Nicolas Bacri was born in Paris, France. His musical studies began with piano lessons at the age of seven. He continued to study harmony, counterpoint, analysis and composition as a teenager with Françoise Levechin-Gangloff and Christian Manen. After 1979, he continued his studies with Louis Saguer. In 1979, Bacri entered the Conservatoire de Paris where he studied with Claude Ballif, Marius Constant, Serge Nigg, and Michel Philippot.

After graduating in 1983 with the premier prix in composition, he attended the French Academy in Rome. Back in Paris, he worked for four years (1987–91) as the Director of Chamber Music for Radio France. Bacri organized the very first performance in France of the complete 15 string quartets cycle by Shostakovich (1989–90 season with the Manhattan String Quartet as a symbol of the end of cold war)  and featured for the first time in France the major composers of Terezin: Pavel Haas, Gideon Klein, Hans Krasa and Viktor Ullmann. Since then, he has concentrated on free-lance composing, receiving commissions from major institutions and festivals around the world. Bacri taught orchestration at the Geneva Conservatory (HEM/HES) from 2005 to 2011. He regularly gives masterclasses in composition in France and abroad (in USA: Rochester Eastman School of music... Russia: Ekaterinburg Ural Academy and China: Beijing Conservatory).
Bacri has received important commissions in all major musical fields: opera, symphony, concertante, vocal, choral and chamber music. In February 2020 Riccardo Muti conducted the world premiere of his Concertante Elegy for Bass Clarinet and Orchestra op. 150 "Ophelia's Tears," with soloist J. Lawrie Bloom, a piece commissioned by the Chicago Symphony Orchestra. Reviewing this performance, Howard Reich of the Chicago Tribune wrote: "The openly emotional writing for the bass clarinet (...) surely defied musical fashions of our noisy age."
In his book The Classical Revolution: Thoughts on New Music in the 21st Century, John Borstlap hailed Bacri as "the most important French composer since Messiaen and Dutilleux...". Bacri has been Professor of Composition at the Conservatoire à Rayonnement Régional (CRR) de Paris since October 2017 and at the Schola Cantorum (Paris) since October 2018.

In his book Notes étrangères, published in 2004 by Seguier (coll. Carré musique, re-edition by L'Harmattan, 2020), Bacri expresses his ideas as:

“My music is not Neoclassical, it is Classical,
for it retains the timeless aspect of Classicism: the rigor of expression.
My music is not Neo-romantic, it is Romantic,
for it retains the timeless aspect of Romanticism: the density of expression.
My music is Modern, for it retains the timeless aspect of Modernism:
the broadening of the field of expression.
My music is Postmodern, for it retains the timeless aspect of Postmodernism:
the mixture of techniques of expression.”

Bacri's Symphony No. 6, Op. 60, was a finalist in the 2003 Masterprize international composing competition.

Bacri made his debut as conductor with the London Symphony Orchestra conducting the world premiere of his opus 130 titled A Day (Four Images for Orchestra) at L'Opéra of the Palace of Versailles in Paris on 8 September 2013. The 29 minutes long symphonic suite was written on commission for the son of South Korean businessman Yoo Byung-eun. It has been recorded at the Abbey Road Studios for a planned future release.

Works sorted by opus number 

1980s
 String Quartet No. 1 (Fantasy op. 1) (1980)
 Concerto for piano and orchestra op. 2 (1980–81)
 Two Lieder for violin (or viola, or cello) and piano op. 3 (1981)
 Serenade No. 1 for solo oboe and ensemble op. 4 (1981–82/rev. 89)
 String Quartet No. 2 (5 pieces opus 5)(1982)
 Episodes nocturnes, for two violas op. 6 No. 1 (1982)
 Threnos for two violas op. 6 Nr. 2 (1987/89)
 Concerto No. 1 for violin and 21 instruments op. 7 (1982–83)
 String trio (Six Sonatas for violin, viola and cello) op. 8 (1982–83)
 Duo No.1 for violin and viola op. 9 (1983–84)
 Serenade No. 2  for solo viola and three instruments op. 10 (1983)
 Symphony No. 1 for large orchestra (dedicated to Elliott Carter) op. 11 (1983–84)
 Bagatelle for piano op. 12 Nr. 1 (1982)
 Bagatelles for clarinet and piano op. 12 Nr. 2 (1985)
 Three Fragments for piano op. 13 (1984–85/88/89)
 Notturni (Concerto da camera quasi una sinfonia piccola) for soprano and ensemble op. 14 (1985–86)
 Four Nocturnes for oboe and violin op. 15 (1985/rev. 87)
 Four Intermezzi (Duo No. 2 for violin and viola) op. 16 (1984/90)
 Concerto for violoncello and orchestra op. 17 (1985/87) (dedicated to Henri Dutilleux)
 String Quartet No. 3 (Esquisses pour un Tombeau) op. 18 (1985/87/88)
 Esquisses pour un Tombeau for string orchestra op. 18b (1985/87/88)
 La Musique d'Erich Zann (Nocturne in hommage to Giacinto Scelsi after H.P. Lovecraft) for solo violin op. 19 (1986/rev.87)
 Capriccio Notturno (Concerto for clarinet and chamber orchestra) op. 20 (1986–87)
 3 Petites Rhapsodies for violin solo op. 21 (1979/86)
 2 Petites Rhapsodies for clarinet solo op. 21b (1979)
 Symphony No. 2 (Sinfonia dolorosa in memoriam Allan Pettersson) op. 22 (1986–88/1990)
 Requiem for viola (or cello) and chamber orchestra op. 23 (1987–88)
 2 preludes for piano op. 24 (1988)
 Duo for violin and cello op. 25 (1987/88/92)
 Serenade Nr. 3 for flute solo and five instruments op. 26 (1987–88/92)
 A Landscape (for Wind quintet) op. 26b (1988/92)
 Quasi Variations for viola (or cello) and piano op. 27 (1989)
 3 Preludes for piano op. 28(1989)
 Tre Canti e Finale (Concerto No. 2 for violin and orchestra) op. 29 (1987–89)
 Cantilènes (for violin and orchestra) op. 29b (1988–89)
1990s
 Folia for orchestra op. 30 (1990)
 Folia for solo viola or cello and string orchestra op. 30b (1990)
 Folia for solo cello and cello ensemble (1990)
 Chaconne for violin and viola op. 30c (1990)
 3 Cello Suites in memoriam Benjamin Britten (1987–93)
 Suite No. 1 op. 31 for cello solo (1987/90/rev.94/2010)
 Suite No.2 "Tragica" op. 31 for cello solo (1991–93)(To Pieter Wispelwey)
 Suite No. 3 "Vita et Mors" op. 31 for cello solo(1992–93)
 Sonate for violoncello and piano op. 32(1990–92/rev.94)
 Sinfonia da Requiem (Symphony No. 3) for orchestra, mezzo-soprano and chorus op. 33 (1988–94)
 Vitae abdicatio (Cantata No. 1 for mezzo-soprano, solo oboe and orchestra) op. 33 Nr. 1 (1992–94)
 Coplas de Jorge Manrique por la muerte de su padre, Cantata No. 2 for a cappella chorus op. 33 Nr. 2 (1993)
 Coplas de Jorge Manrique por la muerte de su padre Cantata No. 2 for female chorus, two bassoons and two horns (or organ) op. 33 Nr. 2b (1993)
 Vita et Mors (Cantata No. 3 for mezzo-soprano, solo cello and orchestra) op. 33 Nr. 3 (1992–93)
 6th prelude for piano op. 33 Nr. 3b (1991)
 In modo infinito op. 33 for orchestra and female (or children) chorus Nr. 4 (1988–90)
 Toccata sinfonica (Piano Trio No. 1) op. 34 (1987–89/rev.2012-13)
 Toccata sinfonica for piano and string quartet op. 34b (1989/93)
 American letters (Trio for clarinet, viola and piano) op. 35 (1991–94):
 Night mysteries (To Elliott Carter) op. 35 Nr. 1 (1993)
 Elegy for A. C. (in memoriam Aaron Copland) op. 35 Nr. 2 (1991–92)
 Adams dances (To John Adams) op. 35 Nr. 3 (1993)
 String Sextet for two violins, two violas and two cellos op. 36 (1991–92)
 Musica per archi (for string orchestra after the String sextet) op. 36b (1991–92)
 Divertimento for clarinet, violin, viola and cello op. 37 (1991–92)
 Divertimento for violin, viola and cello op. 37b (1991–92)
 Sonatine for piano op. 38 (1992)
 Quatre Bagatelles (Four Bagatellen after Piano sonatina for wind quintet) op. 38b (1992)
 Concerto for trumpet ( (Episodes pour trompette, orchestre à cordes, instruments à vent, piano, timbales et caisse-claire en hommage à Michael Tippett) op. 39 (1992/93)
 Sonata for violin and piano op. 40 (1993–94)
 Trois Alleluia [Three Halleluja] op. 41 for a cappella female chorus (1994)
 Four Halleluja's op. 41b for female chorus and orchestra (1994)
 String Quartet No. 4 (Ommagio a Beethoven) op. 42 (1989–90/93-94/rev.95-96)(to the Lindsay Quartet)
 Im Volkston (Divertimento for clarinet, violin and cello) op. 43 (1994)
 Cantata No. 4 (Shakespeare Sonnet No. 66) for mezzo-soprano and string orchestra (or cello ensemble) op. 44 (1994–95)
 Sonata breve (Solo violin sonata No. 1/Sonatina in omaggio a Mozart) op. 45 (1994)
 3 preludes for piano op. 46 (1994–95)
 Les contrastes (Piano Ttrio No. 2) op. 47 (1995)
 Fantaisie for trumpet and organ op. 48 (1991/95/rev.2005)(to Éric Aubier and Thierry Escaich)
 Symphony No. 4 (Sturm und Drang Classical Symphony) op. 49 (1995) (to Louis Langrée)
 Suite No. 4 op. 50 for cello solo (1994/96) (to Emmanuelle Bertrand)
 Symphonie concertante for two pianos and string orchestra op. 51 (1995–96/rev.2006)(in memoriam Mieczyslaw Weinberg)
 Une Prière for viola (or violin, or cello) and orchestra) op. 52 (1994/96-97)
 Sonata No. 2 for solo violin op. 53 (1996) (dedicated to Renaud Capuçon)
 Sonata notturna (Piano Trio No. 3) op. 54 (1996/rev.97)
 Symphony No. 5 (Concerto for orchestra) op. 55 (1996–97)(dedicated to Louis Langrée)
 Fleur et le miroir magique (Children opera op. 55)(1996–97)
 String Quartet No. 5 op. 57 (1997) (dedicated to the Danel Quartet)
 Mondorf Sonatina No. 1 for oboe and clarinet op. 58 Nr. 1 (1997)
 Mondorf Sonatina No. 2 for solo clarinet op. 58 Nr. 2 (1997)
 Cinq motets de souffrance et de consolation (Five Motets for a cappella chorus) op. 59 (1998)
 Symphony No. 6 for large orchestra op. 60 (1998)(dedicated to Serge Nigg)
 Concerto da camera Clarinet concerto (No. 2) for clarinet and string quartet or string orchestra op. 61 (1998)(dedicated to Philippe Cuper)
 Nisi Dominus (Motet No. 6 for a cappella chorus) op. 62 (1998)
 Concerto for flute and orchestra op. 63 (1999)(dedicated  to Philippe Bernold)

2000s
 Benedicat Israël Domino (Mistic Triptych for a cappella mixed chorus) op. 64 (2000)
 Trumpet concerto No. 2 Im Angedenken J. S. Bachs for trumpet and string orchestra op. 65 (2000)
 Divertimento for violin, piano and orchestra op. 66 (1999–2000)
 Sonata da camera for viola (or violin or cello, or clarinet, or saxophone) and piano op. 67 (1977/97-2000)
 Sonata Corta (Piano sonata No. 1) op. 68 (1978–79/rev.2003)
 L'Enfance de l'Art seven youth pieces for piano op. 69 No. 1 (1976–79/rev.2000-03)
 Cahier pour Eloi for piano op. 69 No. 2 (1977–79/rev.2000-01)
 Petites variations sur un thème dodécaphonique for piano op. 69 No. 3 (1979)
 Viola Sonata "Sonata variata" for solo viola op. 70 (2000–01)
 Suite No. 5 "Sonata variata" for solo cello op. 70b (2000–01)
 "Sonata variata" for solo violin op. 70c (2000–01)
 O Lux Beatissima (Motet No. 7 for a cappella female chorus) op. 71 (2001)
 Sinfonietta for string orchestra op. 72 (2001)
 Night Music for clarinet and cello op. 73 (2001)
 Notturno for oboe and string orchestra op. 74 (2001)
 Sonate No 2 for violin and piano op. 75 (2002)
 Elégie for violin and piano op. 75b (2002)
 Kol Nidrei Sonata (Sonate No. 3 for violin solo) op. 76 (2002)
 Isiltasunaren ortzadarra (Cantata No. 5 for mezzo-soprano, chorus and orchestra) op. 77 (2001–02)
 Heriotzetik Bizitzera for a cappella chorus op. 77b (2002)
 Beatus Vir (Motet No. 8 for a cappella chorus) op. 78 (2002)
 Three Nocturnes for flute and string trio op. 79 (2002)
 The Four Seasons, Four Concertos for oboe (or violin), violin, viola and cello (or bassoon) and string orchestra op. 80 (to François Leleux) (2000–11) :
 Concerto nostalgico, (Autumn) for oboe (or violin) and cello (or bassoon) and string orchestra op. 80 No. 1 (2000/02)
 Concerto amoroso, for oboe (or violin) and violin and string orchestra op. 80 No. 2 (2004–05)
 Concerto tenebroso, for oboe (or violin) and viola and string orchestra op. 80 No. 3 (2009)
 Concerto luminoso, for oboe (or violin) and violin, viola, cello and string orchestra op. 80 No. 4 (2010–11)
 Lamento, Ach das ich Wassers genug hätte for counter-tenor (or mezzo-soprano) and string orchestra (or cello ensemble) op. 81 (2002)
 Lamento, Ach das ich Wassers genug hätte (Motet No. 9 for a cappella chorus) op. 81b (2002)
 Sonate d'Yver for two cellos op. 82 (2002–03)
 Concerto No. 3 for violin and orchestra op. 83 (1999–2000/2002-03)
 Sinfonia concertante (for cello and orchestra) op. 83a (1999–2000/2002-03/04)
 Suite for Wind octet op. 83b (2003)
 Preludio, Minuetto e Fuga for two cellos op. 83c (2003/13)
 A Short Overture for orchestra op. 84 (1978/2002-03)
 Elégie in memoriam D.S.C.H. for string orchestra op. 85 (2003/rev.06/12)
 Elégie in memoriam D.S.C.H. for symphony orchestra op. 85b (2003/rev.06/12)
 Stabat Mater for violin solo, solo soprano and chorus op. 86 (2003)
 Cantata Vivaldiana (Cantata No. 6 on the Nisi Dominus) for counter-tenor (or mezzo-soprano) and string orchestra op. 87 (2003-04/rev.10-11)
 Suite No. 6 op. 88 for cello solo (2004/rev.2015)
 Partita for Orchestra  op. 88b (2004)
 Partita concertante for flute (or oboe or clarinet or bassoon) and string quartet or string orchestra  op. 88b (2004)
 Partita da camera for flute (or oboe or clarinet or bassoon) and string trio  op. 88c (2004)
 L'arbre à musique ou les aventures de Séraphine (Children's tale for narrator and small orchestra) op. 89 (2004)
 Nocturne for cello and string orchestra op. 90 (2004)
 Prelude and Fugue (piano) op. 91 (2004)
 12 Monologues Pascaliens for solo flute (or oboe) op. 92 (2004)
 Miserere (Motet No. 10 for a cappella chorus) op. 93 (2004)
 Meditation after a theme from Beethoven for cello ensemble op. 94 (2004)
 Sonata in memoriam Bela Bartok for two violins op. 95 (2005)
 Three Love Songs for soprano and orchestra (or piano) op. 96 (2005)
 String Quartet No. 6 op. 97 (2005–06)
 Sonata seria Piano Trio No. 4 op. 98 (2006)
 Serenade mélancolique" for guitar op. 99 (2004)
 Diletto classico for piano op. 100 (2006-07)
 A Smiling Suite for piano, clarinet and violin (after Diletto classico) op. 100b (2006-07)
 Variations sérieuses (String Quartet No. 7) op. 101 (2006-07) (in memoriam Robert Simpson)
 Meditation on a Chinese theme for Ehru and orchestra op. 102 (2006-07)
 2 Esquisses lyriques for piano op. 103 (2006-07)
 2 Esquisses lyriques for cello and piano op. 103b (2006-07)
 Nocturne for the left hand for piano op. 104 (2006-07)
 Piano Sonata No. 2, op. 105 (2007/rev.08/10)
 Sonata/Meditation, for violin (or viola, or cello) solo op. 106 (2008)
 Via Crucis, Variations for wind orchestra, op. 107 (2008)
 Sonatina lirica, for clarinet (or viola, or alto saxophone) and piano (or string quartet) op. 108 No. 1 (2008)
 Sonatina lapidaria, for clarinet (or viola, or alto saxophone) and piano op. 108 No. 2 (2009)
 Monsieur "M", musical tale for narrator and seven players, op. 109 (2008)
 Lucifer variations, for viola and bassoon, op. 109 No. 2 (2008/10-11)
 Lucifer variations, for cello and bassoon (or two cellos), op. 109 No. 2b (2008/10-11)
 Variations faciles, for piano (after Lucifer variations), op. 109 No. 2c (2008/10-11)
 Lyric Interlude (A Study in Pastoral Style), for English horn (or flute, or clarinet, or viola), violin and cello op. 110 (2008)
 Lyric Interlude (A Study in Pastoral Style), for English horn (or flute, or clarinet, or viola) and piano op. 110b (2008)
 String Quartet No. 8 (Omaggio a Haydn), op. 112 (2008-09)
 Hope (Motet No. 11), for female chorus, op. 113 (2009)
 Entre terres, for narrator, orchestra and chorus, op. 114 (2009)
 Three Impromptus, for flute and piano, op. 115 (2005/09)
 Winter's Night (Concerto-Méditation), for violin and string orchestra, op. 116 (2008-09)
 Musica concertante, for horn (or viola, or cello) and piano, op. 117a (2008-10/12)
 Musica concertante, for horn (or viola, or cello) and wind orchestra, op. 117b (2008-10/12)
 Musica concertante, for horn and string orchestra, op. 117c (2008-10/12)
 Musica concertante, for viola (or cello) and string orchestra, op. 117d (2008-10/12)
2010s
 Quasi una Fantasia (Concerto for three violins and orchestra), op. 118 (2010)
 Melodias de la Melancolia (Four Songs on words by Alvaro Escobar-Molina), for soprano and piano, op. 119a (2010)
 Melodias de la Melancolia (Four Songs on words by Alvaro Escobar-Molina), for soprano and orchestra, op. 119b (2010)
 Magnificat, for female chorus, two violins and cello, op. 120 (2011)
 Métamorphoses for solo cello, op. 121 No. 1 (in hommage to Henri Dutilleux) & 2 (on the name of Benjamin Britten)(2011/12)
 Sonata impetuosa, (Piano Sonata No. 3), op. 122 (2011)
 Seasons (Four Intermezzi for piano), op. 123 (2009-11)
 Symphony No. 7 (Sinfonia tripartita), for large orchestra, op. 124 (2003/11/14) (dedicated to Irina Shostakovich)
 Symphonic Fragments (Overture for large orchestra), op. 124a (2011)
 Funeral Ode in memoriam Maurice André, for six trumpets, op. 125 (2012)
 Deux visages de l'amour, Cantata No. 7 for voice and piano or string quartet or string orchestra, op. 126 (2012/15)
 Drei Romantische Liebesgesange, for voice and piano, or string quartet or string orchestra op. 126 n°1 (2012)
 Chants d'amour, for voice and piano,or string quartet or string orchestra op. 126 n°2 (2015)
 Four Elegies, for cello and piano, op. 127 (2012)
 Sonata No. 2 for cello and piano, op. 128 (2012–13)
 Capriccio romantico, for cello and piano, op. 129 (from Sonata op. 128)(2012–13)
 A Day (Four Images for Orchestra), op. 130 (2013)
 Sonatine et Capriccio, for clarinet or saxophone solo, opus 131 (2013)
 Agnus Dei, for female or children chorus and organ, opus 132 (2013)
 Cosi fanciulli, one act opera, opus 133 (2012–13)
 Fantasy for piano, opus 134 (2014)
 Encore (Two ironical pieces, for violin and piano), opus 135 (1995/2014)
 Cinq moments retrouvés for clarinet (or violin) and piano, opus 136a (or 136b)(1979/rev. 2001/06/13/14)
 Trois moments retrouvés for clarinet, violin and piano, opus 136 (1979/rev. 2001/06/13/14/17)
 Piccolo concerto notturno, for viola and viola ensemble, opus 137 (2014/rev.15)
 Torso (Sonata No. 3 for violin and piano) opus 138 (2014)
 Tenebrae (Nocturne No. 6 op. 139) for piano (2015–16)
 String Quartet No. 9 "Canto di speranza" opus 140 (2015)
 "Hommage à Foujita" (Concertante Serenade for flûte, violin, viola and cello) op. 141 (2014–15)
 String Quartet No. 10 "Métamorphoses" op. 142 (2016–18)
 Sonata a quattro (Quasi variazioni for four clarinets) op. 142a (2016)
 Baltimore sketches for string quartet op. 142b (2016–17)
 Trio lirico (Piano Trio No. 5) for clarinet (or violin), viola (or cello, or horn) and piano, op. 143 (2016–17)
 Trois Esquisses lyriques for piano (Valse triste et Chanson & Danse) op. 144 (2017)
 Of time and Love (Cantata No. 8 for soprano or tenor and piano(or string sextet or string orchestra)on Shakespeare sonnets 63 to 65 op. 145 (2017–18)
 Ophelia's Mad Scene (from Shakespeare's Hamlet) for high soprano and clarinet op. 146a (2018)
 Ophelia (Solo for clarinet or Bass-Clarinet op. 146b) (2018)
 Spring Sonata for flute and piano op. 147 (2018)
 Spring Sonata for flute and string orchestra op. 147b (2018)
 Sonata No. 4 for violin and piano (In Anlehnung an Brahms) op. 148 (2018)
 De la douceur (Two Verlaine Songs for two sopranos and piano) op. 149 (2018–19) Commission of the Philadelphia Chamber Music Society with support from The Pew Center for Arts & Heritage
 Ophelia's Tears (Concertante Elegy for Bass-Clarinet and orchestra) op. 150 (2019) Commissioned by the Chicago Symphony Orchestra Association Riccardo Muti, Zell Music Director (Made possible through the generous support of Helen Zell) (For Lawrie Bloom and to the memory of Oliver Knussen)
 Notturno ed Allegro (Piano Trio No. 6) for two violins and piano or violin (or flute), violoncello (or clarinet, or viola)and piano,op. 151 (2019)
 Notturno ed Allegro for piano, violin, cello, clarinet and horn, op. 151b (2019)
 Notturno ed Allegro for piano, violin, viola and cello, op. 151c (2019)
2020s
 Concerto breve for clarinet and string quartet (or string orchestra), op. 152 (2019-20)
 String Quartet No. 11 "Quartetto Serioso in Omaggio a Beethoven", op. 153 (2019–20)
 Amor Vincit Omnia (Deux Motets op. 154 no. 1 & 2) for a cappella mixed chorus, (2020)
 Amor Vincit Omnia (Motet op. 154 no. 2) version for a cappella female chorus, (2020)
 String Trio, for violin, viola and cello, op. 155 (2020)
 Sonata No. 3 for flûte and piano, op. 156 (2020)
 Pastoral Meditation, for flûte, viola and harp, op. 157 (2020)
 Prelude and toccata, for clarinet and piano, op. 158 (2020)
 The Four temperaments (Four Preludes and fugues for piano, op. 159) (2020-21)

 Recordings 
 Nicolas Bacri: Une Prière WDR Sinfonie Orchester Köln, Semyon Bychkov (conductor), Laurent Korcia (violin). RCA Red Seal, released 2004
 Nicolas Bacri – Sturm und Drang Concerto amoroso Le printemps for oboe, violin and string orchestra, Op.80; Concerto for Flute and Orchestra, Op.63; Concerto nostalgico L'automne for oboe, cello and string orchestra, Op.80 No.1; Nocturne for cello and string orchestra, Op.90; Symphony No.4 Sturm und Drang'', Op.49. Tapiola Sinfonietta conducted by Jean-Jacques Kantorow. BIS Records CD-1579, released 2009.
 Nicolas Bacri – Piano Music (Reyes) – Piano Sonata No. 2 / Diletto classico / Prelude et Fugue / L'Enfance de l'art. Eliane Reyes (pianist). Naxos Records 8.572530, released 2011
 Zodiac Trio – Nicolas Bacri, "A Smiling Suite" (2007). Kliment Krylovskiy (clarinet), Vanessa Mollard (violin), Riko Higuma (piano). Recorded for the Blue Griffin Recording (BG 257) and released in 2012
 Nicolas Bacri – "LES QUATRE SAISONS" François Leleux (oboe), Valeryi Sokolov (violin), Adrien La Marca (viola), Sebastien Van Kuijk (cello), Orchestre Victor Hugo-Franche-Comté/Jean-François Verdier. Recorded for Klarthe and released in 2016 : http://www.klarthe.com/index.php/fr/enregistrements/les-quatre-saisons-detail
 Mysteries - Sabine Weyer – Nicolas Bacri, Piano Sonate No. 2 op. 105, Piano Sonata No. 3 op. 122 "Impetuosa", Fantasy op. 134, recorded for ARS Produktion, and released in 2021
 Brahms aujourd'hui - Agnès Pyka/Laurent Wagschal – Nicolas Bacri, Sonata No. 4 "in Anlehnung an Brahms" op. 148, for violin and piano, recorded for Klarthe

References

External links 
 Official website
 Works by Nicolas Bacri
 Article at Goliath Business News
 Nicolas Bacri at Virtual International Philharmonic

1961 births
Conservatoire de Paris alumni
French classical composers
French male classical composers
Living people
Musicians from Paris